John MacKay (born 13 September 1966) is a Scottish broadcast journalist, television presenter, producer and writer. He currently is a co-anchor for the STV News at Six, alongside Kelly Ann Woodland, having previously served as the chief anchor for the West Central Scotland edition of STV News at Six. MacKay is a presenter for current affairs programme Scotland Tonight.

Born and raised in Glasgow, MacKay attended the University of Glasgow, where he was an editor for the Glasgow University Guardian. He began his career at The Sunday Post newspaper, before trialling for Radio Clyde and later joining BBC Radio Scotland. MacKay joined STV in 1994 as a presenter and reporter for Scotland Today.

Early life 
John MacKay was born on 13 September 1966 in Glasgow, the son of an aero engineer. His family are from the Isle of Lewis in the western isles of Scotland. MacKay grew up in the outskirts of Glasgow in Hillington and attended Penilee Secondary School. He studied politics at the University of Glasgow, where MacKay was an editor of the Glasgow University Guardian.

Career

Early career 
MacKay began his journalism career with The Sunday Post in 1986. He trialled as a radio presenter for Radio Clyde, however, he was later told he “didn't have a voice for broadcast”. After a year at the Post, MacKay left to be a print reporter.

BBC Scotland; 1987 to 1994 
In 1987, MacKay joined BBC Scotland, initially as a news trainee for Radio Scotland and later as a reporter, presenter and producer for radio and television services, including the national news programme Reporting Scotland. He also worked as a sports correspondent. sub-editor and duty editor.

STV; 1994 to present 

He joined Scottish Television (now STV Central) in September 1994 as a reporter and presenter for the regional news programme Scotland Today and became a main anchor four years later, alongside Shereen Nanjiani. In 2006, Scotland Today was rebranded as the STV News at Six. MacKay served as the sole chief anchor and presented the main 6pm programme for Glasgow and the West and the lunchtime bulletin for the Central Scotland region. In October 2011, he became a presenter of STV's current affairs programme, Scotland Tonight, with MacKay presenting on alternate nights with Rona Dougall.

MacKay has also presented and produced non-news programming for STV including the one-off documentary Sir Alex Ferguson: How to Win Games and Influence People and online content including the popular video blog The Real MacKay and the feature series Diary of a Pipe Band.

In September 2018, STV announced STV Glasgow News and STV Edinburgh News would merge to create a central version of the STV News at Six by Scottish Television. The programme is co-anchored by MacKay in Glasgow and Kelly Ann Woodland in Edinburgh.

In April 2020, amid the COVID-19 pandemic, MacKay was furloughed by STV and as result halted presenting both the STV News at Six and Scotland Tonight. The North and Central editions of the STV News were merged to create one nightly news programme. MacKay and Kelly Ann Woodland returned to co-presenting the six o'clock news in September 2020

Books 
Of Hebridean descent, from the district of Carloway, MacKay has written three books all based in the Isle of Lewis. They are "The Road Dance", "Heartland" and "The Last of the Line" (all Luath Press, 2002, 2004 and 2006 respectively). Sorbier Productions, a Glasgow-based production company, is seeking funding to produce a film adaptation of The Road Dance. In May 2022, MacKay's best selling book, The Road Dance, was released as a film, starring Hermione Corfield as Kirsty Macleod.

In 2015, he published "Notes of a Newsman", written about MacKay's journey as a news journalist and his news coverage of the Lockerbie bombing, the opening of the Scottish Parliament and the 2014 Scottish Independence Referendum.  He published his fifth book, "Home", in 2021.

Popular culture
MacKay is a well-known figure in Scotland, particularly in the central belt through his long association with STV. He was portrayed by comedian Jonathan Watson on his sketch show Only an Excuse with the use of his popular opening catchphrase "I'm John MacKay". The Glasgow-based comedian Kevin Bridges has also stated his admiration for MacKay, saying the highlight of his career was saying "Back to John in the studio."

MacKay has also interviewed fictional anchorman Ron Burgundy (played by Will Ferrell) from the 2004 comedy film Anchorman.

Personal life 
MacKay lives in Renfrewshire with his wife Jo. They have two sons.

He is a supporter of Rangers F.C.

Publications

References

External links

1967 births
British male journalists
Living people
Journalists from Glasgow
People from Renfrew
Scottish newspaper editors
Scottish television presenters
Scottish television producers
STV News newsreaders and journalists